Eash is a surname, being an Americanized form of the Swiss German surnames Esch and Isch. Notable people with the surname include:

George Eash (1911–1980), American inventor
Norm Eash (born c. 1953), American football coach

See also
Esch (surname)